Bankura Samhati Law College is a college imparting legal education in Bankura, West Bengal. It was established in the year 2010. It is the only Law College in the entire District and its neighboring District of Purulia. The college is affiliated to Bankura University. This college is also approved by the Bar Council of India.

Courses 
The college offers a five-years integrated B.A. LL.B. (Hons.) course and three years B.A. LL.B. course.

References

Law schools in West Bengal
Universities and colleges in Bankura district
Colleges affiliated to Bankura University
Educational institutions established in 2010
2010 establishments in West Bengal